New Zealand actress Melanie Lynskey made her professional debut at the age of sixteen when she starred as murderess Pauline Parker in Heavenly Creatures (1994), a crime drama directed by Peter Jackson and co-starring Kate Winslet. Following a three-year hiatus, she returned to the screen with a supporting role opposite Drew Barrymore in the big-budget romance Ever After (1998). Lynskey spent the next few years appearing in films such as Detroit Rock City (1999), But I'm a Cheerleader (1999), Coyote Ugly (2000), Snakeskin (2001), Abandon (2002), and Sweet Home Alabama (2002).

Between 2003 and 2015, Lynskey appeared as Rose—the devious love interest of Charlie Harper (played by Charlie Sheen)—on the CBS sitcom Two and a Half Men. During this time she also appeared in the independent drama Shattered Glass (2003), Clint Eastwood's war epic Flags of Our Fathers (2006), Sam Mendes's comedy-drama Away We Go (2009), Jason Reitman's Up in the Air (2009) alongside George Clooney, Steven Soderbergh's The Informant! (2009) opposite Matt Damon, and Thomas McCarthy's Win Win (2011).

Lynskey's starring role in the 2012 drama Hello I Must Be Going was a turning point in her career, and led to a string of prominent parts in films such as Happy Christmas (2014), The Intervention (2016) and the acclaimed thriller I Don't Feel at Home in This World Anymore (2017), establishing her as a key figure on the independent film scene. Her portrayal of Michelle Pierson on the HBO series Togetherness (2015–2016) earned her a nomination for a Critics' Choice Award. She then starred as Molly Strand on the Hulu horror series Castle Rock (2018) and had prominent roles in the miniseries' Mrs. America (2020)—alongside Cate Blanchett— and Candy (2022) opposite Jessica Biel. In 2021, she co-starred with Leonardo DiCaprio in Adam McKay's political satire Don't Look Up. Lynskey's transition to mainstream success was solidified by her starring role as Shauna on the Showtime mystery-thriller series Yellowjackets (2021–present). The performance earned her a Critics' Choice Award for Best Actress and a nomination for the Primetime Emmy for Outstanding Lead Actress.

Film

Television

Podcasts

Music videos

References

Actress filmographies
Filmographies